The St. Louis Cardinals, a Major League baseball (MLB) franchise based in St. Louis, Missouri, have competed in the National League (NL) since 1892, and in the American Association (AA) from 1882 to 1891.  They have won 11 World Series titles, one additional interleague championship and were co-champions (tied) in another prior to the modern World Series.  Known as the Cardinals from 1900 to the present, the St. Louis franchise were also known as the Brown Stockings (1882), Browns (1883–98), and Perfectos (1899).  A total of 37 players and other personnel associated with the Cardinals have been inducted into the National Baseball Hall of Fame and Museum in Cooperstown, New York.

The first former Cardinals players to be inducted into Baseball Hall of Fame were John McGraw and Cy Young in 1937, the second year of the Museum's annual balloting.  Rogers Hornsby was the first to be inducted as Cardinal, which occurred in 1942.  Of the 38 former Cardinals elected to the Hall of Fame, 17 have been inducted as Cardinals and nine with the Cardinals logo on their cap. The most recent individual associated with the Cardinals to be inducted is Lee Smith, inducted in 2019. The next former Cardinal to be inducted will be Ted Simmons in 2020; he is expected to be inducted as a Cardinal.

In addition, two separate awards – the Ford Frick Award and J. G. Taylor Spink Award – while not conferring the status of enshrining their recipients as members of the Hall of Fame, honor the works of a total of six sportswriters and broadcasters in connection with their coverage of the Cardinals.  The Cardinals also have a franchise hall of fame known as the St. Louis Cardinals Hall of Fame Museum located within Ballpark Village adjacent to Busch Stadium, the Cardinals' home stadium.

St. Louis Cardinals players, managers, and executives

Broadcasters and sportswriters

 Bob Uecker, a Ford C. Frick Award winner, also played for the St. Louis Cardinals.

Artifacts
The National Baseball Hall of Fame and Museum has collected artifacts related to notable achievements of Cardinals players, including:

 Chick Hafey's glove, spikes and glasses.
 The glove Taylor Douthit wore when setting the Major League record for outfield putouts in 1928.
 Stirrups Dizzy Dean wore
 Switch hitter Frankie Frisch's bat. 
 A jersey of Joe Medwick's, circa 1937.
 The Most Valuable Player Award trophy presented to Stan Musial in 1946.
 The spikes Lou Brock wore when he stole his 893rd base in a game against the San Diego Padres, on August 29, 1977, breaking Ty Cobb's record.

See also
List of Los Angeles Dodgers in the Baseball Hall of Fame
List of New York Yankees in the Baseball Hall of Fame

References
Footnotes

Source notes

Hall of Fame
Cardinals